Basildon railway station is on the London, Tilbury and Southend line, serving the town of Basildon, Essex. Its three-letter station code is BSO.

History
It was opened by British Rail in 1974 to serve the new town of Basildon, which was previously served by Laindon station. The station and all its trains are currently operated by c2c.

Facilities 
The station has two platforms, both located on the upper level.

The ticket hall houses a retail unit as well as self-service ticket machines. The ticket office has three serving positions.

Services 
Basildon is served by c2c trains westbound to Fenchurch Street in the City of London and eastbound to Shoeburyness in eastern Essex.

The typical Monday-Friday off-peak service pattern is:
 2 trains per hour to London Fenchurch Street;
 2 trains per hour to Shoeburyness.

References

External links 

Transport in the Borough of Basildon
Railway stations in Essex
DfT Category C2 stations
Railway stations opened by British Rail
Railway stations in Great Britain opened in 1974
Railway stations served by c2c